Thermocopy (Thermocopy of Tennessee, Inc.) is the oldest and largest business technology company located in East Tennessee. The Knoxville, Tennessee-based company was founded in the early 1960s as an office equipment dealer, later supplying information technology support, document management consultation, and printer fleet management services. The company's core office products are multi-functional copiers, printers and fax machines made by Ricoh, and Kyocera. The company supports sustainable business practices, and helped to establish GoGreenET.com, the annual Business In The Green contest, and other environmental initiatives in the community.

ImageSource Magazine named Thermocopy its 2006 Dealer of the Year with its national Perfect Image Award.

In March 2010 was designated a Kyocera Certified Managed Print Services Dealer. Thermocopy is a vendor neutral managed service provider, with technicians trained to service equipment from many manufacturers.

History 
 On April 1, 1964, Randall Sumner, with two partners, formed a company to sell office paper with an initial investment of US$150 and a $3,000 note for operating capital. The company began as a dealer for NCR "ThermoCopy" paper. Later that year, they began selling NCR adding machines.

They shifted their focus from paper sales to office equipment as copier use expanded. By the end of the 1970s, Thermocopy was the leading local dealer for color copiers, fax machines, and overhead projectors. The company changed locations within the Bearden area of Knoxville several times throughout the 1960s, until moving to their current location at 3505 Sutherland Avenue in 1971.

Thermocopy experienced steady growth over the next several decades. In 1995 Steve Sumner purchased the company from its founder, Randall Sumner. In the mid-1990s Thermocopy increased its market share, and expanded its operations in 1998 with an office in Johnson City, Tennessee. Thermocopy's Mountain Empire Branch serves the Tri-Cities region of Northeast Tennessee and Southwestern Virginia.

In 2014, Thermocopy marked five decades in business with its 50th anniversary celebrations.

Community involvement 
Thermocopy has since its early days sponsored organizations and charities including the Historic Tennessee Theatre, Boys and Girls Clubs of the Tennessee Valley, Give Haiti Hope, Mercy Health Partners Foundation, Keep Knoxville Beautiful, and Covenant Health's Buddy's Race for the Cure. Thermocopy is a supporter of the Knoxville-Oak Ridge Innovation Valley.

Environment
In 2008 Thermocopy was one of ten local businesses certified by the Knoxville Area Chamber Partnership's Green Recognition Program in its inaugural year. The company tracks and publicly reports the results of its environmental initiatives on its ThermocopyGreenworks website. Thermocopy is one of the founding partners of GoGreenET.com and co-sponsors the Greater Knoxville Business Journal’s annual Business In The Green contest. Thermocopy supports the conservation work of the Fort Loudon Lake Association.

Keep Knoxville Beautiful awarded the  "2008 Environmental Achievement Award for Outstanding Achievement By A Large Business" to Thermocopy for the company's internal efforts and community involvement. The next year Thermocopy received a "Keep Tennessee Beautiful" (the state chapter of Keep America Beautiful) and Tennessee Department of Transportation Award of Excellence for Business.

Thermocopy has been named a Platinum Level Recycle Champion by Knox County, Tennessee.

Training center 
Thermocopy employs an onsite, manufacturer-certified trainer

References

External links
Thermocopy official website
50th Anniversary
Customer Feedback Forum
Thermocopy Greenworks program
GoGreenET.com
Knoxville-Oak Ridge Innovation Valley

Information technology consulting firms of the United States
Computer companies of the United States
Companies based in Knoxville, Tennessee
Technology companies established in 1964